The Charleston Coliseum & Convention Center (originally known as Charleston Civic Center) is a municipal complex located in the downtown area of Charleston, West Virginia, United States. Originally completed in 1958, it consists of four main components: the Coliseum, the Theater, the Auditorium, and the Convention Center (also referred to as the Grand Hall).

History
In 1953, the first in a series of general obligation bonds was approved by city voters for the construction of a civic center in the downtown area of Charleston, West Virginia between Lee Street and Quarrier Street on the banks of the Elk River just before the Elk River empties into the Kanawha River. When the original Civic Center opened in November 1958 at the cost of $2.5 million, it consisted of a 6,000-seat arena and the 750-seat "Little Theater."

The complex underwent its first renovation and expansion in 1964 when 2,400 additional seats were added to the arena and a paved parking lot and an ice rink were added to the facilities. The $1.5 million project was financed through the sale of revenue bonds.

The most significant renovation and expansion began when city voters approved a $10 million general obligation bond sale in 1976 to erect a 13,000-seat coliseum, a two-story lobby that connected the new coliseum with the original arena and theater, and remodel the original arena into a convention center. The project also received an additional $10 million in federal matching grants and was completed in 1980.

Two parking garages were added in 1983, accommodating up to 1,300 cars. In 1994, the  Grand Hall of the convention center received a new ceiling, paint and lighting and the ice rink was also converted into an exhibit hall in the 2001. The last renovations took place between 2004 and 2006 when about $250,000 was spent to renovate the Little Theater.

After Pride Youth Programs' annual anti-drug convention in early 2007, Jay DeWispelaere, CEO of Pride Youth Programs, commented on what he felt were the inadequacies of the Charleston Civic Center. In May 2015, the Charleston's Municipal Planning Commission approved the permit need to move forward with a planned comprehensive expansion and renovation, expected to cost around $72 million.  Construction began in September 2015, with an expected completion date in early 2018.  The Civic Center will remain open during construction.

As part of a 10-year sponsorship deal with the organization, the Charleston Civic Center's new basketball court (which debuted in the 2011-12 season) is branded with a large logo for Friends of Coal, a locally based political advocacy group.

Events
A number of annual events and fairs throughout the year at the complex. Among the events includes the Annual West Virginia Hunting and Fishing Show, West Virginia Association of Fairs & Festivals Conference, West Virginia International Auto Show, West Virginia Sports Show, the Taste of Charleston, and the Capital City Art & Craft Show. Several local high schools hold proms and graduation ceremonies at the Civic Center. The Civic Center has also hosted local show choir festivals, including the state competition.

It hosts the quarterfinals, semifinals, and finals of the annual, West Virginia State High School Boys and Girls Basketball Tournaments, music concerts, professional wrestling, and hosted basketball games between in-state rivals West Virginia University and Marshall University until that series ended in 2016. West Virginia State University held its commencement ceremonies in the Coliseum until 2013.

The Charleston Light Opera Guild conducts performances in the Little Theater throughout the year.

References

Basketball venues in West Virginia
Buildings and structures in Charleston, West Virginia
College basketball venues in the United States
Continental Basketball Association venues
Convention centers in West Virginia
Marshall Thundering Herd basketball venues
Music venues in West Virginia
Sports venues in West Virginia
Tourist attractions in Kanawha County, West Virginia
Sports venues completed in 1959
1959 establishments in West Virginia